The Ibiza wall lizard (Podarcis pityusensis) is a species of lizard in the family Lacertidae. It is most closely associated with the island of Eivissa, or Ibiza, in the Balearic Islands, but has become naturalized in parts of Spain.

A subspecies, P. pityusensis formenterae, is limited in natural habitat to the islands of Formentera, Illa Conillera and Es Vedrà, south of Ibiza, but has been transported by humans to several other locations in the Mediterranean. The Formentean subspecies tends to be more brightly coloured than its Ibizan and mainland con-specifics.

The natural habitats of P. pityusensis are temperate shrubland, Mediterranean-type shrubby vegetation, rocky areas, rocky shores, arable land, pastureland, plantations, rural gardens, and urban areas.

Description
The Ibiza wall lizard grows to a maximum snout-to-vent length of  but adults are usually a little smaller than this. The tail is about twice as long as the body. It is robust with a short-head and rounded body with relatively coarse, slightly keeled scales. The dorsal surface is usually green but can be grey or brownish. There is usually a well-defined pale dorso-lateral stripe and there may be a row of dark spots or a dark line running along the spine. The underside is white, cream, grey, orange or pink and the throat, and occasionally the belly, may be blotched with darker colour.

Distribution and habitat
The Ibiza wall lizard is native to the islands of Ibiza and Formentera in the Balearic Islands and the neighbouring rocky islets. It has been introduced to Muella de Palma (Mallorca), Barcelona where it once was assumed it died out but was 're-discovered' in 2007 (Bruekers, 2007) in the town of Aleria in southern Spain and the island of Gaztelugatxe in northern Spain. This lizard largely inhabits vegetated areas especially in those association with man. As well as gardens, pasture and arable land, it is found on rocks, especially near the coast. On some small islets, it may be very common and live almost exclusively on rock.

Biology
The Ibiza wall lizard feeds on small invertebrates including a high proportion of ants when they are available. It also eats vegetable matter, especially during the summer. Females generally produce a single clutch of one to four eggs. They become sexually mature at the age of one and a half or two years.

Status
Although this lizard does not seem to be in overall decline and faces no significant threats, its total area of occurrence is less than  so the IUCN lists it as being "Near threatened".. More recently, the lizard is facing a threat from invasive snakes which originated from mainland Spain which came to Ibiza in imported olive trees. < https://www.thetimes.co.uk/article/ibizans-take-up-clubs-against-plague-of-snakes-killing-off-their-beloved-lizard-spxbwxzqp >

Gallery

References

Bruekers, J. (2007) - Wiederentdeckung von Podarcis pityusensis pityusensis in Barcelona - Die Eidechse, Bonn, 18: 79-84

External links
Cold-blooded Cannibals: Extreme Adaptations to Island Life is a short documentary on adaptations to island life in the Ibiza Wall Lizard.

See Also 
 The Italian Wall Lizard, a related species

Podarcis
Fauna of the Balearic Islands
Animals of Ibiza
Reptiles described in 1883
Taxa named by Eduardo Boscá
Taxonomy articles created by Polbot